Flags of Our Fathers is a 2006 American war film directed, co-produced, and scored by Clint Eastwood and written by William Broyles Jr. and Paul Haggis. It is based on the 2000 book of the same name written by James Bradley and Ron Powers about the 1945 Battle of Iwo Jima, the five Marines and one Navy corpsman who were involved in raising the flag on Iwo Jima, and the after effects  of that event on their lives.

The film is taken from the American viewpoint of the Battle of Iwo Jima, while its companion film, Letters from Iwo Jima, which Eastwood also directed, is from the Japanese viewpoint of the battle. Although it was a box office failure, only grossing $65.9 million against a $90 million budget, the film received favorable reviews from critics.

The companion film Letters from Iwo Jima was released in Japan on December 9, 2006, and in the United States on December 20, 2006, two months after the release of Flags of Our Fathers on October 20, 2006.

Until June 23, 2016, the author Bradley's father John Bradley, Navy corpsman, was misidentified as being one of the figures who raised the second flag, and incorrectly depicted on the bronze statue memorial, as one of the five flag-raisers of the  monument. Also, until October 16, 2019, Rene Gagnon was also misidentified.

Plot
As three US servicemen – Marine Private First Class Ira Hayes, Private First Class Rene Gagnon, and Navy Pharmacist's Mate 2nd Class John "Doc" Bradley – are feted as heroes in a war bond drive, they reflect on their experiences via flashback.

After training at Camp Tarawa in Hawaii, the 28th Marine Regiment 5th Marine Division sails to invade Iwo Jima. The Navy bombards suspected Japanese positions for three days. Sergeant Mike Strank is put in charge of Second Platoon.

The next day, February 19, 1945, the Marines land in Higgins boats and LVTs. The beaches are silent and Private First Class Ralph "Iggy" Ignatowski wonders if the defenders are all dead before Japanese heavy artillery and machine guns open fire on the advancing Marines and the Navy ships. Casualties are heavy, but the beaches are secured.

Two days later, the Marines attack Mount Suribachi under a rain of Japanese artillery and machine gun fire, as the Navy bombards the mountain. Doc saves the lives of several Marines under fire, which later earns him the Navy Cross. The mountain is eventually secured.

On February 23, the platoon under command of Sergeant Hank Hansen reaches the top of Mount Suribachi and hoists the United States flag to cheers from the beaches and the ships. Secretary of the Navy James Forrestal, who witnesses the flag raising as he lands on the beach, requests the flag for himself. Colonel Chandler Johnson decides his 2nd Battalion deserves the flag more. Rene is sent up with Second Platoon to replace the first flag with a second one for Forrestal to take. Mike, Doc, Ira, Rene, and two other Marines (Corporal Harlon Block and Private First Class Franklin Sousley) are photographed by Joe Rosenthal as they raise the second flag.

On March 1, the Second Platoon is ambushed from a Japanese machine gun nest. During the fight over the nest, Mike is hit by a U.S. Navy shell and dies from his wounds. Later that day, Hank is shot in the chest and dies, and Harlon is killed by machine gun fire.

Two nights later, while Doc is helping a wounded Marine, Iggy is abducted by Japanese troops and dragged into a tunnel. Doc finds his viciously mangled body a few days later. On March 21, Franklin is killed by machine gun fire and dies in Ira's arms. Of the eight men in the squad, only three are left: Doc, Ira, and Rene. A few days after Franklin's death, Doc is wounded by artillery fire while trying to save a fellow corpsman. He survives and is sent back home. On March 26, the battle ends and the U.S. Marines are victorious.

After the battle, the press gets hold of Rosenthal's photograph. It is a huge morale booster and becomes famous. Rene is asked to name the six men in the photo; he identifies himself, Mike, Doc, and Franklin, but misidentifies Harlon as Hank. Rene eventually names Ira as the sixth man, even after Ira threatens to kill him for doing so.

Doc, Ira, and Rene are sent home as part of the seventh bond tour. When they arrive to a hero's welcome in Washington, DC, Doc notices that Hank's mother is on the list of mothers of the dead flag raisers. Ira angrily denounces the bond drive as a farce. The men are reprimanded by Bud Gerber of the Treasury Department, who tells them that the country cannot afford the war and if the bond drive fails, the U.S. will abandon the Pacific and their sacrifices will be for nothing. The three agree not to tell anyone that Hank was not in the photograph.

As the three are sent around the country to raise money and make speeches, Ira is guilt-ridden, faces discrimination as a Native American, and descends into alcoholism.  After he throws up one night in front of General Alexander Vandegrift, commandant of the Marine Corps, he is sent back to his unit and the bond drive continues without him.

After the war, the three survivors return to their homes. Ira still struggles with alcoholism and is never able to escape his unwanted fame. One day after being released from jail, he hitchhikes over 1,300 miles to Texas to see Harlon Block's family. He tells Harlon's father that his son was indeed at the base of the flag in the photograph. In 1954, the USMC War Memorial is dedicated and the three flag raisers see each other one last time. In 1955, Ira is found dead and he is suspected to have died from exposure after a night of drinking. There was no autopsy. That same year, Doc drives to the town where Iggy's mother lives to tell her how Iggy died, though it is implied that he does not tell her the truth. Rene attempts a business career, but finds that the opportunities and offers he received during the bond drive are rescinded. After failing to find work as a police officer, he spends the rest of his life as a janitor. Doc, by contrast, is successful, buying a funeral home. In 1994, on his deathbed, he tells his story to his son, James, and in a final flashback to 1945, the men swim in the ocean after raising the flags.

Cast
 Ryan Phillippe as Pharmacist's Mate Second Class John Bradley, the only one of the six flag raisers who was not a Marine
 George Grizzard as Elderly John Bradley
 Jesse Bradford as Private First Class Rene Gagnon
 Adam Beach as Private First Class Ira Hayes
 John Benjamin Hickey as Technical Sergeant Keyes Beech
 John Slattery as Bud Gerber
 Paul Walker as Sergeant Hank Hansen, who helped with the first flag raising and was misidentified as Harlon Block
 Jamie Bell as Private Ralph Ignatowski
 Barry Pepper as Sergeant Michael Strank
 Robert Patrick as Lieutenant Colonel Chandler Johnson
 Neal McDonough as Captain Dave Severance
 Harve Presnell as Elderly Dave Severance
 Melanie Lynskey as Pauline Harnois Gagnon
 Tom McCarthy as James Bradley
 Chris Bauer as General Alexander Vandegrift, the Commandant of the Marine Corps
 Gordon Clapp as General Holland Smith, who led the invasion of Iwo Jima
 Ned Eisenberg as Joe Rosenthal, the journalist who took the famous photograph
 Judith Ivey as Belle Block
 Ann Dowd as Mrs. Strank
 Myra Turley as Madeline Evelley
 Jason Gray-Stanford as Lieutenant Harold G. Schrier
 Joseph Michael Cross as Private First Class Franklin Sousley
 Benjamin Walker as Corporal Harlon Block, who was misidentified as Hank Hansen
 Alessandro Mastrobuono as Corporal Chuck Lindberg
 Scott Eastwood as Private Roberto Lundsford
 David Patrick Kelly as President Harry S. Truman
 Jeremiah Kirnberger as Gunners Mate 1st Class
 Stark Sands as Private Walter Gust
 George Hearn as Elderly Walter Gust

Production
The film rights to the book were purchased by DreamWorks in June 2000. Producer Steven Spielberg brought William Broyles to write the first drafts of the script, before director Clint Eastwood brought Paul Haggis to rewrite. In the process of reading about the Japanese perspective of the war, in particular General Tadamichi Kuribayashi, Eastwood decided to film a companion piece with Letters from Iwo Jima, which was shot entirely in Japanese. Bradley Cooper auditioned for one of the leading roles. Flags of Our Fathers was shot in the course of 58 days. Jared Leto was originally cast as Rene Gagnon but had to back out due to a tour commitment with his band, Thirty Seconds to Mars.

Flags of Our Fathers cost $55 million, although it was originally budgeted at $80 million. Variety subsequently downgraded the price tag to $55 million. Although the film is taken from the American viewpoint of the battle, it was filmed almost entirely in Iceland and Southern California, with a few scenes shot in Chicago.  Shooting ended early 2006, before production for Letters from Iwo Jima began in March 2006.

Release

Critical reception
On review aggregator Rotten Tomatoes, Flags of Our Fathers has an approval rating of 73% based on 196 reviews, with an average rating of 7.01/10. The site's consensus states: "Flags of Our Fathers is both a fascinating look at heroism, both earned and manufactured, and a well-filmed salute to the men who fought at the battle of Iwo Jima." On Metacritic, the film scored a 79 out of 100 based on 39 reviews, indicating "Generally favorable reviews." Roger Ebert gave the film four stars out of four praising the film for its depiction of war.

The film made the top-10 list of the National Board of Review. Eastwood also earned a Golden Globe nomination for directing. The film was nominated for two Academy Awards — for Best Sound Mixing (John T. Reitz, David E. Campbell, Gregg Rudloff, and Walt Martin) and Sound Editing. Film critic Richard Roeper said, "Clint Eastwood's Flags of Our Fathers stands with the Oscar-winning Unforgiven and Million Dollar Baby as an American masterpiece. It is a searing and powerful work from a 76-year-old artist who remains at the top of his game... [and] Flags of Our Fathers is a patriotic film in that it honors those who fought in the Pacific, but it is also patriotic because it questions the official version of the truth, and reminds us that superheroes exist only in comic books and cartoon movies."

Top ten lists
Flags of Our Fathers was listed on numerous critics' top ten lists for 2006.

 1st – Kenneth Turan, Los Angeles Times (tied with Letters from Iwo Jima)
 1st – Michael Wilmington, Chicago Tribune
 1st – Kirk Honeycutt, The Hollywood Reporter
 1st – Stephen Hunter, The Washington Post
 2nd – Scott Foundas, L.A. Weekly (tied with Letters from Iwo Jima)
 3rd – Peter Travers, Rolling Stone (tied with Letters from Iwo Jima)
 3rd – Shawn Levy, Portland Oregonian (tied with Letters from Iwo Jima)
 3rd – Jack Matthews, New York Daily News (tied with Letters from Iwo Jima)
 3rd – Lou Lumenick, New York Post (tied with Letters from Iwo Jima)
 3rd – Richard Roeper, At the Movies (tied with Letters from Iwo Jima)
 3rd – Claudia Puig, USA Today
 4th – William Arnold, Seattle Post-Intelligencer
 5th – Ray Bennett, The Hollywood Reporter
 5th – Richard Schickel, Time
 5th – David Edelstein, Fresh Air (tied with Letters from Iwo Jima)
 7th – Roger Ebert, Chicago Sun-Times (tied with Letters from Iwo Jima)
 Best of 2006 (listed alphabetically, not ranked) – David Denby, The New Yorker

Box office
Despite critical acclaim, the film under-performed at the box office, earning just $65,900,249 worldwide on an estimated $90 million production budget. Its companion film Letters From Iwo Jima was more profitable with a box office run of $71 million on a budget of $19 million.

Spike Lee controversy
At the 2008 Cannes Film Festival, director Spike Lee, who was making Miracle at St. Anna, about an all-black U.S. division fighting in Italy during World War II, criticized director Clint Eastwood for not depicting black Marines in Flags of Our Fathers. Citing historical accuracy, Eastwood responded that his film was specifically about the Marines who raised the flag on Mount Suribachi at Iwo Jima, pointing out that while black Marines did fight at Iwo Jima, the U.S. military was segregated during World War II, and none of the men who raised the flag were black. Eastwood believed Lee was using the comments to promote Miracle at St. Anna and angrily said that Lee should "shut his face". Lee responded that Eastwood was acting like an "angry old man", and argued that despite making two Iwo Jima films back to back, Letters from Iwo Jima and Flags of Our Fathers, "there was not one black Marine in both of those films".

Contrary to Lee's claims, however, black Marines (including an all-black unit) are seen in several scenes during which the mission is outlined, as well as during the initial landings, when a wounded black Marine is carried away. During the end credits, historical photographs taken during the Battle of Iwo Jima show black Marines. Although black Marines fought in the battle, they were restricted to auxiliary roles, such as ammunition supply, and were not involved in the battle's major assaults; they did, however, take part in defensive actions. According to Alexander M. Bielakowski and Raffaele Ruggeri, "Half a million African Americans served overseas during World War II, almost all in segregated second-line units." The number of African Americans killed in action was 708.

Spielberg later intervened between the two directors, after which Lee sent a copy of a film on which he was working to Eastwood for a private screening as a seeming token of apology.

Home media
The DVD was released in the United States by DreamWorks Home Entertainment and internationally by Warner Home Video on February 6, 2007. It is devoid of any special features.

A two-disc Special Collector's Edition DVD (with special features) was released on May 22, 2007. It was also released on HD DVD and Blu-ray formats.

The Two-Disc Special Collector's Edition DVD is also available in a five-disc commemorative set that also includes the two-disc Special Collector's Edition of Letters from Iwo Jima and a bonus fifth disc containing History Channel's Heroes of Iwo Jima documentary and To the Shores of Iwo Jima, a documentary produced by the United States Navy and the United States Marine Corps, released by Warner Home Video.

See also
 C. C. Beall
 Second flag-raiser corrections

References

Bibliography

External links

  
 
 
 
 
 Interview: Clint Eastwood Flags of Our Fathers
 eFilmCritic.com Interview with James Bradley about Flags of Our Fathers 
 eFilmCritic.com Interview with Barry Pepper about Flags of Our Fathers 

2006 films
2000s war films
American historical adventure films
American war films
American war adventure films
Anti-war films about World War II
Battle of Iwo Jima films
Films based on non-fiction books
Films directed by Clint Eastwood
Films produced by Clint Eastwood
Films produced by Robert Lorenz
Films produced by Steven Spielberg
Films set in Chicago
Films set in Massachusetts
Films set in Texas
Films set in the 1940s
Films set in the 1950s
Films set in the 1990s
Films set in Wisconsin
Films shot in Chicago
American nonlinear narrative films
Pacific War films
Films scored by Clint Eastwood
Films with screenplays by Paul Haggis
Films about the United States Marine Corps
World War II films based on actual events
Amblin Entertainment films
Malpaso Productions films
DreamWorks Pictures films
Paramount Pictures films
Warner Bros. films
Japan in non-Japanese culture
American World War II films
2000s English-language films
2000s American films